Nikita Melnikov may refer to:
 Nikita Melnikov (wrestler) (born 1987), Russian wrestler
 Nikita Melnikov (footballer), Russian football player